Darya Skrypnik (born 12 December 1987) is a Belarusian judoka. She competed at the 2016 Summer Olympics in the women's 52 kg event, in which she was eliminated in the first round by Mareen Kräh.

In 2017, she competed in the women's 52 kg event at the 2017 European Judo Championships held in Warsaw, Poland.

References

External links
 
 

1987 births
Living people
Belarusian female judoka
Olympic judoka of Belarus
Judoka at the 2016 Summer Olympics
European Games competitors for Belarus
Judoka at the 2015 European Games
21st-century Belarusian women